Catadupa integrana is the only species in the monotypic moth genus Catadupa of the family Pyralidae (snout moths).  Both the genus and species were described by Francis Walker in 1863. It is found in Brazil.

References

Moths described in 1863
Chrysauginae
Moths of South America